The 2014–15 Southeastern Conference men's basketball season began with practices in October 2014, followed by the start of the 2014–15 NCAA Division I men's basketball season in November.  Conference play started in early January 2015 and concluded in March, followed by the 2015 SEC men's basketball tournament at the Bridgestone Arena in Nashville.

Preseason 

() first place votes

Preseason  All-SEC teams

Coaches select 8 players
Players in bold are choices for SEC Player of the Year

Rankings

SEC regular season

Conference matrix
This table summarizes the head-to-head results between teams in conference play.

Postseason

SEC tournament

  March 11–15, 2015 Southeastern Conference Basketball Tournament, Bridgestone Arena, Nashville.

NCAA tournament

NIT

Honors and awards

All-Americans

Starting on March 6, the 2015 NCAA Men's Basketball All-Americans were released for 2014–15 season, based upon selections by the four major syndicates. The four syndicates include the Associated Press, USBWA, NABC, and Sporting News.

AP
First Team
Willie Cauley-Stein, Kentucky
Second Team
Bobby Portis, Arkansas
Karl-Anthony Towns, Kentucky

USBWA
First Team
Willie Cauley-Stein, Kentucky
Second Team
Bobby Portis, Arkansas

NABC
First Team
Willie Cauley-Stein, Kentucky
Third Team
Karl-Anthony Towns, Kentucky

Sporting News
First Team
Willie Cauley-Stein, Kentucky
Third Team
Bobby Portis, Arkansas
Karl-Anthony Towns, Kentucky

All-SEC awards and teams

Coaches

References

External links
SEC website